Wes Lysack (born March 3, 1978) is a former professional Canadian football defensive back. He most recently played for the Toronto Argonauts of the Canadian Football League. He was drafted by the Calgary Stampeders in the first round with the fifth overall pick in the 2003 CFL Draft. He played CIS Football for the University of Manitoba after playing his freshman year for Rutgers .

Lysack has also played for the Winnipeg Blue Bombers and the Calgary Stampeders, winning a Grey Cup with the Stamps in 2008.

On February 16, 2011, Lysack signed with the Toronto Argonauts. After one season with the team, he was released on February 13, 2012.

He has also played in the Winnipeg, Manitoba Major Football League, with the St. Vital Mustangs.

References

External links
Calgary Stampeders bio

1978 births
Living people
Calgary Stampeders players
Canadian football defensive backs
Manitoba Bisons football players
Players of Canadian football from Alberta
Canadian football people from Edmonton
Toronto Argonauts players
Winnipeg Blue Bombers players